Pihlajasaari (Rönnskär in Swedish) is an island in Helsinki, the capital of Finland.

Pihlajasaari actually consists of two separate islands connected with a bridge. The islands can only be reached by boat, and in summer there is a privately operated commuter boat travelling between Kaivopuisto and Pihlajasaari every couple of hours.

Pihlajasaari is an outdoor island with no permanent residents. It is mostly intended as a holiday resort. One of the two islands offers large beaches for swimming and sunbathing, and its own restaurant.

On the other island there is a camping area, and also a unisex nudist beach, one of only two in the entire country (the other is in Pori). Unlike the main beaches in Pihlajasaari, the nudist beach consists almost entirely of bare cliffs with very little sand.

See also
List of islands of Finland

External links

 Official website

Islands of Helsinki
Tourist attractions in Helsinki
Nude beaches